Randy Johnson (born 1963) is an American former baseball pitcher.

Randy Johnson may also refer to:

Sports
Randy Johnson (quarterback) (1944–2009), American football quarterback
Randy Johnson (offensive lineman) (born 1953), American football player
Duke Johnson (Randy Johnson Jr., born 1993), American football running back
Randy Johnson (designated hitter) (born 1958), American former baseball designated hitter, 1980–1982
Randy Johnson (third baseman) (born 1956), American former baseball infielder, 1982–1984

Others
Randy Johnson (council member), current Hennepin County commissioner
Randy D. Johnson (born 1959), former member of the Florida House of Representatives

See also
Randy Johnston (disambiguation)
Peter Randall Johnson (1880–1956), British cricketer